The School of Education is one of the ten constituent colleges that compromise Duquesne University in Pittsburgh, Pennsylvania. Founded in 1929, the school was organized by Holy Ghost Father and future university president Raymond V. Kirk, who led the school until 1940. Currently, the School of Education is principally housed in the historic Canevin Hall, the oldest building on Duquesne's campus still used for classes.

Programs offered
The first program offered by the school was for Secondary Education, and since then, offers thirteen different programs: Music Education (1936), Elementary Education (1937), Guidance (1952), School Administration (1952), Special Education (1964), Reading Specialist and Reading Supervisor (1969), School Psychology (1969), Early Childhood Education (1975 and 1997), School Supervision (1976), Superintendent's Letter of Eligibility (1993), English as a Second Language (2003), and Business, Computer, and Information Technology (2004).

Administration
The dean of the school is Dr. Cindy M. Walker, Ph. D.

References

External links
 Duquesne University School of Education website

School School of Education
Educational institutions established in 1929
Schools of education in Pennsylvania
1929 establishments in Pennsylvania